Betty Limpany was executed by hanging in Devon in 1799. She had worked as a maid and was accused of arson by burning down her master's house in Kentisbeare. She was 17 or 18 years old.

In 1997 Wide Angle Productions produced a film based on the case.

References

External links
 

1799 deaths
18th-century English criminals
British people convicted of arson
English female criminals
People executed by England by hanging
People from Mid Devon District
Year of birth unknown
Criminals from Devon
1780s births